This article provides details of international football games played by the Qatar national football team from 2020 to present.

Results

2020

2021

2022

2023

Forthcoming fixtures
The following matches are scheduled:

Head to head records

Notes

References

Football in Qatar
Qatar national football team results
2020s in Qatari sport